The non-marine molluscs of Uganda are the molluscan fauna of Uganda (wildlife of Uganda). Since Uganda is a land-locked country, there are no marine species present. A number of species of freshwater and land molluscs are found in the wild in Uganda.

66 native molluscs of Uganda were listed in 2010 IUCN Red List of Threatened Species.

There are 297 species of land snails in Uganda.

Freshwater gastropods 

Planorbidae
 Africanogyrus coretus (de Blainville, 1826)
 Bulinus mutandensis Preston, 1913 - endemic

Lymnaeidae
 Radix natalensis (Krauss, 1848)

Land gastropods 

Land gastropods in Uganda include (there is listed 168 species according to Wronski & Hausdorf B. (2010) and some additional records in this list meantime):

Cyclophoridae
 Elgonocyclus koptaweliensis (Germain, 1934)

Maizaniidae
 Maizania elatior (Martens, 1892)
 Maizania volkensi (Martens, 1895)

Veronicellidae
 Laevicaulis striatus (Simroth, 1896)
 Laevicaulis stuhlmanni (Simroth, 1895)
 Pseudoveronicella liberiana (Gould, 1850)

Succineidae
 Quickia concisa (Morelet, 1849)
 "Succineidae species A"
 "Succineidae species B"

Valloniidae
 Acanthinula straeleni Adam, 1954
 Pupisoma (Ptychopatula) dioscoricola (C. B. Adams, 1845)
 "Pupisoma (Ptychopatula) species A"
 "Pupisoma (Ptychopatula) species B"
 "Pupisoma (Ptychopatula) species C"
 "Pupisoma (Pupisoma) species A"

Truncatellidae
 Negulus ruwenzoriensis Adam, 1957

Vertiginidae
 Nesopupa (Afripupa) bisulcata (Jickeli, 1873)
 Truncatellina ninagongensis (Pilsbry, 1935)
 Truncatellina pygmaeorum (Pilsbry & Cockerell, 1933)
 Truncatellina ruwenzoriensis Adam, 1957

Cerastidae
 Cerastus trapezoideus rapezoideus (Martens, 1892)
 Conulinus rutshuruensis Pilsbry, 1919
 "Conulinus species A"
 Edouardia metula (Martens, 1895)
 "Edouardia species A"
 Rhachidina braunsi (Martens, 1869)

Achatinidae
 Archachatina (Tholachatina) osborni (Pilsbry, 1919)
 Limicolaria elegans Thiele, 1911
 Limicolaria martensiana (E. A. Smith, 1880)
 Limicolaria saturata E. A. Smith, 1895

Ferussaciidae
 Cecilioides (Cecilioides) kalawangaensis Dartevelle & Venmans, 1951
 Cecilioides (Cecilioides) tribulationis (Preston, 1911)
 Cecilioides (Geostilbia) callipeplum (Connolly, 1923)

Micractaeonidae
 Micractaeon koptawelilensis (Germain, 1934)

Subulinidae
 "Bocageia (Liobocageia) species A"
 Curvella babaulti Germain, 1923
 Curvella bathyraphe Pilsbry & Cockerell, 1933
 Curvella conoidea (Martens, 1892)
 Curvella entebbensis Preston, 1912
 Curvella ovata (Putzey, 1899)
 "Curvella species A"
 "Curvella species B"
 Ischnoglessula cruda (Pilsbry, 1919)
 Ischnoglessula echinophora (Verdcourt, 2006)
 Ischnoglessula elegans (Martens, 1895)
 Ischnoglessula famelica (Pilsbry, 1919)
 Ischnoglessula gracillima (Pilsbry, 1919)
 Kempioconcha terrulenta (Morelet, 1883)
 Nothapalus adelus Connolly, 1923
 Nothapalus paucispira (Martens, 1892)
 Nothapalus stuhlmanni (Martens, 1897)
 Nothapalus ugandanus Connolly, 1923
 Opeas toroense Connolly, 1923
 "Opeas species A"
 "Opeas species B"
 "Opeas species C"
 Oreohomorus apio Wronski & Hausdorf, 2009
 Oreohomorus nitidus (Martens, 1897)
 Pseudoglessula intermedia Thiele, 1911
 Pseudopeas burunganum Connolly, 1923
 Pseudopeas curvelliforme Pilsbry, 1919
 Pseudopeas elgonense Connolly, 1923
 Pseudopeas iredalei Connolly, 1923
 "Pseudopeas species A"
 Subulina entebbana Pollonera, 1907
 Subulina subcrenata Martens, 1895
 Subulina viridula Connolly, 1923
 Subuliniscus lucasi Pilsbry, 1919
 "Subuliniscus species A"
 Subulona clara (Pilsbry, 1919)
 Subulona ischna (Pilsbry, 1919)
 Subulona pinguis (Martens, 1895)

Streptaxidae
 Gonaxis latula (Martens, 1895)
 Gonaxis translucida (Dupuis & Putzeys, 1901)
 Gulella (Avakubia) avakubiensis Pilsbry, 1919
 Gulella (Conogulella) conospira (Martens, 1892)
 Gulella (Gulella) laevigata (Dohrn, 1865)
 Gulella (Gulella) mikenoensis (Preston, 1913)
 Gulella (Molarella) malasangiensis (Preston, 1913)
 Gulella (Molarella) ugandensis (E. A. Smith, 1901)
 Gulella (Paucidentina) brevis (Thiele, 1911)
 Gulella (Paucidentina) masisiensis Pilsbry, 1919
 Gulella (Plicigulella) vicina adelpha (Preston, 1913)
 Gulella (Primigulella) linguifera (Martens, 1895)
 Gulella (Pupigulella) pupa (Thiele, 1911)
 Gulella (Silvigulella) osborni Pilsbry, 1919
 Gulella (Tortigulella) cara Pilsbry, 1919
 Gulella (Tortigulella) heteromphala Pilsbry, 1919
 Gulella (Tortigulella) lessensis Pilsbry, 1919
 Gulella (Wilmattina) disseminata (Preston, 1913)
 Gulella decussatula (Preston, 1913)
 Gulella ruwenzoriensis van Bruggen & van Goethem, 1999
 Gulella selene van Bruggen & van Goethem, 1999
 Gulella virungae van Bruggen & van Goethem, 1999
 Pseudogonaxis pusillus (Martens, 1897)
 Ptychotrema (Ennea) bequaerti (Dautzenberg & Germain, 1914)
 Ptychotrema (Ennea) fraterculus Pilsbry, 1919
 Ptychotrema (Ennea) paradoxulum (Martens, 1895)
 Ptychotrema (Ennea) pollonerae Preston, 1913
 Ptychotrema (Ennea) silvaticum Pilsbry, 1919
 Ptychotrema (Haplonepion) geminatum (Martens, 1895)
 Ptychotrema (Haplonepion) runsoranum (Martens, 1892)
 Ptychotrema (Parennea) aequatoriale Pilsbry, 1919
 Ptychotrema (Parennea) cossyphae van Bruggen, 1989
 Ptychotrema (Parennea) goossensi (Adam & van Goethem, 1978)
 Ptychotrema (Parennea) kerereense (Adam & van Goethem, 1978)
 Ptychotrema (Parennea) kigeziense (Preston, 1913)
 Ptychotrema (Parennea) pelengeense (Adam & van Goethem, 1978)
 Streptostele (Graptostele) teres Pilsbry, 1919
 Streptostele (Raffraya) horei E. A. Smith, 1890
 Streptostele (Streptostele) bacillum Pilsbry, 1919
 Streptostele (Streptostele) coloba Pilsbry, 1919
 "Streptostele (Streptostele) species A"
 "Streptostele (Streptostele) species B"
 Varicostele lessensis Pilsbry, 1919

Punctidae
 Paralaoma servilis (Shuttleworth, 1852)
 Punctum pallidum Connolly, 1922
 Punctum ugandanum (E. A. Smith, 1903)

Charopidae
 Afrodonta kempi (Connolly, 1925)
 Prositala butumbiana (Martens, 1895)
 Trachycystis iredalei Preston, 1912
 Trachycystis lamellifera (E. A. Smith, 1903)

family ?
 "Punctoidea species A"

Helicarionidae
 Kaliella barrakporensis (L. Pfeiffer, 1852)
 Kaliella iredalei Preston, 1912

Euconulidae
 Afroconulus iredalei (Preston, 1912)
 "Afroconulus species A"
 "Afroconulus species B"
 Afroguppya rumrutiensis (Preston, 1911)
 Afroguppya solemi de Winter & van Bruggen, 1992
 "Afroguppya species A"
 Afropunctum seminium (Morelet, 1873)

Urocyclidae
 Atoxon pallens Simroth, 1895
 Chlamydarion spatiosus (Preston, 1914)
 Gymnarion aloysiisabaudiae (Pollonera, 1906)
 Thapsia cf. hanningtoni (E. A. Smith, 1890)
 Thapsia cf. inclinans (Preston, 1914)
 Thapsia kigeziensis (Preston, 1913)
 Thapsia rufescens Pilsbry, 1919
 Thapsia rutshuruensis Pilsbry, 1919
 "Thapsia species A"
 Trichotoxon heynemanni Simroth, 1888
 Trochonanina (Trochonanina) lessensis (Pilsbry, 1919)
 Trochozonites (Teleozonites) adansoniae (Morelet, 1848)
 Trochozonites (Trochozonites) bellula (Martens, 1892)
 Trochozonites (Trochozonites) plumaticostata Pilsbry, 1919
 Trochozonites (Trochozonites) trifilaris ituriensis Pilsbry, 1919
 Trochozonites (Zonitotrochus) aillyi Pilsbry, 1919
 Trochozonites (Zonitotrochus) medjensis Pilsbry, 1919
 "Trochozonites (Zonitotrochus) species A"
 "Verrucarion species A"
 "Verrucarion species B"
 "Sheldoniinae species A"
 "Sheldoniinae species B"
 "Sheldoniinae species C"
 "Sheldoniinae species D"
 "Sheldoniinae species E"
 "Sheldoniinae species F"
 "Sheldoniinae species G"
 "Sheldoniinae species H"
 "Sheldoniinae species I"
 "Sheldoniinae species J"

Halolimnohelicidae
 Halolimnohelix cf. bukobae (Martens, 1895)
 Halolimnohelix cf. fonticula (Preston, 1914)
 Halolimnohelix hirsuta Pilsbry, 1919
 Halolimnohelix cf. malasangiensis (Preston, 1914)
 Halolimnohelix cf. soror (Preston, 1914)
 "Halolimnohelix species A"
 "Halolimnohelix'' species B"

Freshwater bivalves

See also
Lists of molluscs of surrounding countries:
 List of non-marine molluscs of Kenya
 List of non-marine molluscs of Sudan, Wildlife of Sudan
 List of non-marine molluscs of the Democratic Republic of the Congo, Wildlife of the Democratic Republic of the Congo
 List of non-marine molluscs of Rwanda, Wildlife of Rwanda
 List of non-marine molluscs of Tanzania

References

 Molluscs, Non marine

Molluscs
Uganda
Uganda